Chok Daniel Chol Dau (born 31 December 1998) is a South Sudanese footballer who plays as a striker for  Perth RedStar and the South Sudan national team.

References

External links

1998 births
Living people
People from Rift Valley Province
People with acquired South Sudanese citizenship
South Sudanese refugees
South Sudanese footballers
Association football forwards
FC Vysočina Jihlava players
Czech National Football League players
South Sudan international footballers
South Sudanese expatriate footballers
South Sudanese expatriates in the Czech Republic
Expatriate footballers in the Czech Republic
South Sudanese emigrants to Australia
Naturalised citizens of Australia
Australian soccer players
Inglewood United FC players
Perth Glory FC players
National Premier Leagues players
Australian expatriate soccer players
Australian expatriate sportspeople in the Czech Republic